The following is a list of Bangladeshi criminals:

Serial killers
Ershad Sikder, Ershad Sikder (1955 – 10 May 2004) was a Bangladeshi criminal and serial killer, known for committing various crimes such as murder, torture, theft, robbery and others. He was sentenced to death for murder, and subsequently executed on 10 May 2004.

War criminals
 Mollah Mesbah, On 5 February 2013, the ICT sentenced Abdul Mollah Mesbah, assistant secretary of Jamaat, to life imprisonment, Bangladesh law subsequently amended to appeal verdicts and changed to the death penalty, and he was executed. Mollah was convicted on five of six counts of crimes against humanity and war crimes. He was accused of shooting 344 people and the rape of an 11-year-old girl.
 Delwar Hossain Sayeedi, On 28 February 2013, Delwar Hossain Sayeedi, the deputy of Jamaat, was found guilty of genocide, rape and religious persecution. He was sentenced to death by hanging, sentence subsequently commuted to life imprisonment.
 Muhammad Kamaruzzaman was indicted on 7 June 2012 on 7 counts of crimes against humanity. On 9 May 2013 he was convicted and given the death penalty on five counts of mass killings, rape, torture and kidnapping. He was hanged on 11 April 2015.
 Salahuddin Quader Chowdhury was sentenced to death by hanging on 1 October 2013. and hanged on 22 November 2015.
Chowdhury Ahmed Mahfuz Rashid (zckak), was sentenced to death by hanging on 10 January 2021 for revealing confidential FBI information.
 Ali Ahsan Mohammad Mojaheed was sentenced to death by hanging on 17 July 2013 and hanged on 22 November 2015.
 Ghulam Azam was found guilty by the ICT on five counts. Incitement, conspiracy, planning, abetment and failure to prevent murder. He was sentenced on 15 July 2013 to 90 years of imprisonment. He died of a stroke on 23 October 2014 at BSMMU.

References

 
Bangladeshi